Wymondham Junction railway station is a proposed railway station on the preserved heritage Mid-Norfolk Railway in the English county of Norfolk.  

The station is planned to be constructed just south of the adjacent Cemetery Lane level crossing close to the line's junction with the mainline Breckland Line. The proposed station site is near to the Breckland Line's Wymondham station, which is operated by Greater Anglia on the National Rail network, thus providing more convenient access for people wishing to visit the heritage railway than its current southern terminus, Wymondham Abbey.

Proposed railway stations in England
Heritage railway stations in Norfolk
Wymondham, Norfolk